is a small asteroid, classified as a near-Earth object of the Amor group, that is a temporary horseshoe companion to Mars.

Discovery 
 was discovered on 10 November 2020, by J. Bulger, K. Chambers, T. Lowe, A. Schultz, and M. Willman observing
for the survey conducted by Pan-STARRS at Haleakalā Observatory, Hawaii. As of 20 January 2021, it has been observed 28 times with an observation arc of 24 days.

Orbit and orbital evolution 
 is currently an Amor asteroid, a subgroup of the near-Earth objects that approach the orbit of Earth from beyond, but do not cross it. It orbits the Sun at a distance of 1.3–1.8 AU once every 23 months (687 days; semi-major axis of 1.52 AU). Its orbit has a moderate eccentricity of 0.17 and an inclination of 19° with respect to the ecliptic. It is most notable for its horseshoe orbit, a complex co-orbital motion with Mars, as both bodies have similar semi-major axes. The object can also be classified as a Mars-crosser, intersecting the orbit of the Red Planet at 1.66 AU.

Mars trojan 
 (leading):
  †
 (trailing):

 5261 Eureka (1990 MB) †
  †
  †

References 
 

Further reading
 Understanding the Distribution of Near-Earth Asteroids Bottke, W. F., Jedicke, R., Morbidelli, A., Petit, J.-M., Gladman, B. 2000, Science, Vol. 288, Issue 5474, pp. 2190–2194.
 A Numerical Survey of Transient Co-orbitals of the Terrestrial Planets Christou, A. A. 2000, Icarus, Vol. 144, Issue 1, pp. 1–20.
 Debiased Orbital and Absolute Magnitude Distribution of the Near-Earth Objects Bottke, W. F., Morbidelli, A., Jedicke, R., Petit, J.-M., Levison, H. F., Michel, P., Metcalfe, T. S. 2002, Icarus, Vol. 156, Issue 2, pp. 399–433.
 Transient co-orbital asteroids Brasser, R., Innanen, K. A., Connors, M., Veillet, C., Wiegert, P., Mikkola, S., Chodas, P. W. 2004, Icarus, Vol. 171, Issue 1, pp. 102–109.

External links 
 Discovery MPEC 
 List Of Amor Minor Planets (by designation), Minor Planet Center
 
 
 

Minor planet object articles (unnumbered)
Mars-crossing asteroids

20201110